John Beale (c.1608 – 1683) was an English clergyman, scientific writer, and early Fellow of the Royal Society. He contributed to John Evelyn's Sylva, or A Discourse of Forest-Trees and the Propagation of Timber, and was an influential author on orchards and cider. He was also a member of the Hartlib Circle.

Life
He was born in Yarkhill, Herefordshire, the son of Thomas Beale, a lawyer and farmer, and Joanna Pye; he was a nephew of Robert Pye and Walter Pye. He was educated at the King's School, Worcester by Henry Bright, who is thought to have nurtured his early study of Erasmus, and then at Eton College, before going to King's College, Cambridge in 1629. In his own account he had a photographic memory, and had early read in Melanchthon, Johannes Magirus and Zacharias Ursinus;  he read philosophy to the King's students for two years. Thomas Birch identifies this period as the time when Ramism and Calvinism fell out of fashion there. He graduated B.A. in 1633, M.A. in 1636, and was Fellow from 1632 to 1640. He travelled on the continent in the late 1630s, and was rector of Sock Dennis, Somerset from 1638.

Beale proposed an art of memory to Samuel Hartlib, in 1656. Hartlib, writing to Robert Boyle in 1658, said of Beale: "There is not the like man in the whole island". He became rector of Yeovil, Somerset, in 1660.

In January, 1663 he was elected a Fellow of the Royal Society.

Works
His works are:

Aphorisms concerning Cider, printed in John Evelvn's Sylva 1664, and entitled in the later editions of that work, General Advertisements concerning Cider.
Herefordshire Orchards, a Pattern for all England, written in an Epistolary Address to Samuel Hartlib, Esq. By I. B., Lond. 1656; reprinted in Richard Bradley's New Improvements of Planting and Gardening, 1724 and 1739.
Papers in the Philosophical Transactions.
Letters to Robert Boyle, printed in the 5th volume of Boyle's works.

Notes

References

Further reading
Douglas Chambers. "Wild pastorall encounter": John Evelyn, John Beale and the renegotiation of pastoral in the mid-seventeenth century. In Leslie, Michael; Raylor, Timothy (ed.), Culture and Cultivation in Early Modern England: Writing and the Land (Leicester, 1992), 173-94.
Peter H. Goodchild, 'No Phantasticall Utopia, but a Reall Place'. John Evelyn, John Beale and Backbury Hill, Herefordshire, Garden History, Vol. 19, No. 2 (Autumn, 1991), pp. 105-127. Published by: The Garden History Society. Stable URL: https://www.jstor.org/stable/1586888
Michael Leslie, The Spiritual Husbandry of John Beale, in Culture and Cultivation in Early Modern England: Writing and the Land (1992).

1608 births
1683 deaths
17th-century English Anglican priests
Alumni of King's College, Cambridge
Fellows of the Royal Society
People educated at Eton College
People educated at King's School, Worcester